Huo Daishan is a photojournalist and environmentalist, winner of the Ramon Magsaysay Award.  He is the founder of Guardians of the Huai River, which advocates for protection of the Huai River in China.

Huo grew up in Shenqiu County (part of Henan Province) in the Huai River Basin; amidst rising cancer rates, he persuaded local factory leaders to better treat their waste water.  He has led mapping efforts in the river’s basin, while investigating and monitoring the sources of pollution.

References

Chinese environmentalists
Living people
Year of birth missing (living people)